Jane's Addiction is an American rock band from Los Angeles, formed in 1985. The band consists of vocalist Perry Farrell, guitarist Dave Navarro, drummer Stephen Perkins and bassist Eric Avery. Jane's Addiction was one of the first bands from the early 1990s alternative rock movement to gain both mainstream media attention and commercial success in the United States. 

Founded by Farrell and Avery, following the disintegration of Farrell's previous band Psi Com, Jane's Addiction's first release was a self-titled live album, Jane's Addiction (1987), which caught the attention of Warner Bros. Records. The band's first two studio albums, Nothing's Shocking (1988) and Ritual de lo Habitual (1990), were released to widespread critical acclaim, and an increasing cult fanbase. As a result, Jane's Addiction became icons of what Farrell dubbed the "Alternative Nation". The band's initial farewell tour, in 1991, launched the first Lollapalooza, which has since become a perennial alternative rock festival.

In 1997, the band reunited with Flea of the Red Hot Chili Peppers replacing Avery on bass guitar for a one-off tour. In 2001, a second reunion took place, with Martyn LeNoble—and later Chris Chaney—occupying the role of bass guitarist. In 2003, the band released its third studio album, Strays, before dissolving again the following year. In 2008, the band's original line-up reunited and embarked on a world tour. Avery acrimoniously left the band in early 2010, as the group began working on new material. In 2011, the band released its fourth studio album, The Great Escape Artist, with Chaney returning to the band for its recording and subsequent tour.

Between the years of 2012 and 2022, the band remained active with occasional tours and performances honouring their legacy. In August 2022, Avery rejoined the band after a twelve-year absence, ahead of a joint tour with the Smashing Pumpkins. Due to ongoing struggles with long COVID, Navarro was replaced by Queens of the Stone Age guitarist Troy Van Leeuwen for the duration of the tour. As the three-piece of Farrell, Avery and Perkins began working on new material, Navarro remained absent from the band. Josh Klinghoffer was announced as his touring replacement in 2023 until at least April.

History

1985–1987: Formation and Jane's Addiction
Jane's Addiction formed from the remains of frontman Perry Farrell's previous band, Psi Com. In mid-1985, Farrell was searching for a bassist to replace Kelly Wheeler in the faltering Psi-com. He was introduced to Eric Avery by Carla Bozulich (later of The Geraldine Fibbers), and the pair bonded over a mutual appreciation of Joy Division and The Velvet Underground. They began to practice together, although Avery never became a full-fledged member of Farrell's disintegrating group.

The new band was dubbed "Jane's Addiction" in honor of Farrell's housemate, Jane Bainter, who was their muse and inspiration. "My girlfriend [Casey Niccoli] and I were sitting in the car…" Farrell recalled, "and we started to think about band names. She threw in Jane's Heroin Experience. I thought it wasn't vague enough. If you want to invite people in, you don't want to put heroin on your door."

In its formative incarnation, Jane's Addiction went through four guitarists and featured Matt Chaikin, formerly of Kommunity FK, on drums.

After Chaikin failed to show up for rehearsals, Farrell sought a new drummer. Avery's younger sister Rebecca suggested her boyfriend Stephen Perkins. Avery was uncertain because of their differing tastes in music, but eventually relented. After Perkins was hired, the drummer and Rebecca promised to get their friend Dave Navarro into the group. Based on Perkins' recommendation, the band auditioned and hired Navarro.

Jane's Addiction became a sensation on the Los Angeles club scene, primarily headlining at Scream, and won interest from a variety of record labels. While the group decided to sign with Warner Bros. Records, they insisted on releasing their debut on independent record label Triple X Records first. The band's manager negotiated the largest advance up to that point, with Warner Bros. signing the band for between $250,000 to $300,000. In January 1987, the band recorded its debut Jane's Addiction during a performance at the Roxy Theatre, at a cost of $4,000. Before the album's release, Jane's Addiction supported British band Love and Rockets on a two-month tour in late 1987. In late 1987, the band opened for former Bauhaus vocalist Peter Murphy at the now demolished Fender's Ballroom in Long Beach.

1988–1989: Nothing's Shocking
In January 1988, Jane's Addiction went into the studio to record its major label debut and follow-up to Jane's Addiction, Nothing's Shocking. Warner Bros. gave Jane's Addiction a list of producers to choose from, but the group chose Dave Jerden.

Nothing's Shocking was released in 1988. "Mountain Song" was released as a single; MTV refused to air the song's music video because of a scene containing full frontal nudity. Farrell then decided to release the music video commercially with added live footage to create the Soul Kiss home video. Because of lack of airplay on MTV and modern rock radio, the album only sold 200,000 to 250,000 copies in its first year of release.

After the album's release, the band went on tour, opening for Iggy Pop and The Ramones. By the end of the tour, Jane's Addiction was headlining clubs and theaters.

During the recording sessions, Farrell stated he wanted 50% of the band's publishing royalties for writing the lyrics, plus a quarter of the remaining half for writing music, adding up to 62.5%. Bassist Eric Avery said he and the other members – guitarist Dave Navarro and drummer Stephen Perkins – were stunned by these demands. Farrell refused to compromise. One day Jerden drove to the studio to find Farrell, Navarro, and Perkins leaving; Farrell told him the band had broken up and there would be no record. Warner Bros. called an emergency meeting to resolve the situation. Farrell received the percentage he sought, and the other members received 12.5 percent each. Avery said the incident had a profound effect on the band, creating an internal fracture.

Not long after the royalties dispute, Farrell and Avery – who had cofounded the band – had a falling-out. This was the result of Avery's newfound sobriety as well as an incident in which Farrell believed Avery had drunkenly tried to pick up his girlfriend. "Unfortunately," Farrell recalled, "the tensions between Eric and I affected the whole family. Some people were asked to take sides, and others just moped about because they didn't know what was going on." Perkins, however, is reported to have got along with Navarro, Avery and Farrell.

1989–1991: Ritual de lo Habitual
Jane's Addiction was scheduled to begin recording its next album in mid-1989. Navarro later stated he had almost no recollection of working on the album due to his addiction to heroin. Ritual de lo Habitual was released in 1990. To support it, the band embarked on a lengthy tour. Farrell recalled, "That thirteen-month tour behind Ritual was half the reason we wound up unable to stand one another. The other half is that I am an intolerable narcissist who can't get along with anyone."

Part of the tour included headlining the first Lollapalooza festival, which traveled across North America in mid-1991. The festival, created by Farrell and Marc Geiger, was to become a farewell for Jane's Addiction, but also a showcase for other cult artists: Siouxsie and the Banshees, Nine Inch Nails, the Butthole Surfers, Living Colour, The Rollins Band, The Violent Femmes, and Ice-T's Body Count. The headliners began to get more exposure than ever before: "Been Caught Stealing" and "Stop!" became hits and earned rotation on MTV. During the very first Lollapalooza show, Farrell and Navarro got into a fight onstage after violently bumping each other mid-song. The band walked off, but came back to play an encore; however, the fight continued and Navarro eventually threw his guitar into the crowd. Regardless, the band continued the tour and played about 25 more Lollapalooza shows, frequently covering Sly and the Family Stone's "Don't Call Me Nigger, Whitey" with Ice-T and Body Count.

Differences between the members on the issue of drug use on the "Ritual" tour led to a schism: Farrell and Perkins regularly partook, while Avery and Navarro abstained. According to Spin (1991, Vol. 7 Num. 3), between shows, Avery and Navarro sought to avoid temptation by retiring to a section of the tour bus set aside for them. After shows, Avery and Navarro (and Navarro's wife at the time, Tanya) would retire to their hotel. "They have," said Spin, "simply learned that they cannot use drugs of any kind anymore without becoming slaves to them, and that slavery is death."

In late 1991, Avery told Navarro that he planned to leave. Navarro quickly agreed to do the same. The two told their management, who in turn tried to convince them to play in Japan, but Avery and Navarro only wanted to play as much as was contractually obligated. The band played its last shows in Australia and Hawaii before disbanding. "It's weird to be at the end of a cycle like that," remarked Avery, "having run the gamut of the usual 'rock story' from beginning to end: you get signed, get strung out, break up."

1997: First reunion and Kettle Whistle
Dave Navarro joined the Red Hot Chili Peppers in 1993 and during a hiatus for the band, Navarro along with Chili Peppers's Flea joined Porno for Pyros to record "Hard Charger" in 1997 for Howard Stern's movie, Private Parts soundtrack. This led to a brief Jane's Addiction Relapse tour, with Flea replacing Avery who declined an invitation to rejoin the band. They produced a compilation album titled Kettle Whistle featuring two new songs with Flea on bass. In 2010, Perkins stated that "Flea, to me, was a great match in '97. As a drummer, he was very exciting for me to work with."

2001-2004: Strays
"I got a phone call from a promoter who asked me if I would be interested in re-forming the band for the Coachella festival in LA," said Farrell in 2001, "and taking the band on tour after that... This comes at a time when this record [his solo album Song Yet to Be Sung] is about to be plucked. Steve [Perkins] played on three of the songs, and Dave [Navarro] played with Steve on the single. So there are plans for Jane's' summer tour."

The consequent 2001 Jubilee Tour featured largely the classics, alongside "Hungry" from Navarro's Trust No One and "Happy Birthday Jubilee" from Song Yet to Be Sung. Fans were told to expect a "Sexual Psycho Circus... half-naked, penny rafters, guitar solos, and tribal drums..." Indeed, during 'Classic Girl', scantily clad stage dancers filled the arenas. Avery declined to be involved. Since Flea was busy with the Chili Peppers, Porno for Pyros bassist Martyn LeNoble was enlisted. (Fellow Pyros member Peter DiStefano guested at one show, to play "Pets".)

Following the success of this tour, the band decided to record a follow-up album to Ritual De Lo Habitual and tapped Chris Chaney to replace LeNoble on bass. They entered the studio with producer Bob Ezrin in 2001, recording as a band for the first time in over 10 years. The result was a fourth album, Strays. Some of the songs (or parts of songs) dated far back in the band's history, while others were new. Reaction was generally favorable, with Rolling Stone reporting that "The band sounds familiar" and "beefier" though without the "glint of madness" of the original line-up. The first single, "Just Because", reached number 72 on the Billboard Hot 100, while "Superhero" garnered exposure as the theme for HBO's hit series Entourage.

The band spent 2003 on an extensive worldwide tour in support of Strays, including a summer headliner slot in a reincarnated Lollapalooza U.S. tour. Following this homecoming of sorts, Jane's Addiction once again broke up towards the end of 2003 after canceling several dates. Although details surrounding the band's demise are sparse, Navarro claimed on his website, in June 2004, that the reasons were essentially the same as they were in 1991. Perkins later stated, "We always break up if it's not real. We really can't fake it… We can make a million dollars for three months touring but we would fucking hate each other, which isn't good. Even with the nostalgia, it's not worth it if it doesn't sound good, or look good. One of the things with Jane's is that we have never been good at faking it."

A hits album – Up from the Catacombs – The Best of Jane's Addiction – was released on September 19, 2006.

2008–2010: Return of Eric Avery and NIN/JA Tour

Jane's Addiction performed at the first-ever NME Awards USA on April 23, 2008, with the reunited core line-up of Perry Farrell, Dave Navarro, Eric Avery, and Stephen Perkins. This was the first performance with bassist Eric Avery since 1991, taking place after their acceptance speech for the "Godlike Genius Award". To follow this up, the original line up performed their first full set in 17 years in Los Angeles on October 23, 2008, at La Cita Bar, and played two further club gigs at the El Cid in Los Angeles on November 20. and the Echoplex on February 16, 2009. On April 11, 2009, they had a birthday bash for Perry that included members of Jane's Addiction and Porno for Pyros on the same stage; the bash was nicknamed Perrypalooza.

Around this time, photos of Farrell, Navarro, Avery and Perkins, taken by Trent Reznor, appeared on Nine Inch Nails' official web site, leading to speculation that Reznor could be helping Jane's Addiction record new material. "He did his best to be both producer and psychologist," Farrell said, in a Billboard report about tension between himself and Avery. "He was very respectful, trying to get out of the way and not overproduce. I wish honestly he would've produced a little more, but he was a little gun-shy after seeing us explode on each other in the studio. He became the referee for a day and after that day I think he was done." Nonetheless, Reznor subsequently posted a blog entry announcing that Jane's Addiction would accompany Nine Inch Nails on their summer 2009 tour, which kicked off on May 8 in West Palm Beach, Florida.

To accompany the tour, newly recorded versions of "Chip Away" and "Whores" were released for free via the official tour website. Farrell explained: "To get some creative juice flowing, we went into the studio for about two weeks. We had the idea to re-record two tunes, just because they'd never been done officially in the studio. And we had some fun writing some new things. A handful that are close to finished, but not quite done. But there's no rush to put anything out at this point." Navarro blogged: "We wanted to give our longtime listeners something to celebrate the tour and 'Whores' has always been one of the tracks that defined Jane's early on."

A retrospective box set, A Cabinet of Curiosities, was released to coincide with the NIN/JA tour in April 2009.

In July 2009, Jane's Addiction was scheduled to play the Splendour in the Grass festival in Australia when a health issue forced a last-minute cancellation. Music Feeds reports that an arm infection, probably that of drummer Stephen Perkins, is the cause of the cancellation. The entire Australian leg of the Jane's Addiction 2009 world tour was cancelled, though Jane's Addiction would play the next year's Splendour in the Grass.

Jane's Addiction performed at the 2009 Voodoo Fest held at City Park in New Orleans, Louisiana over Halloween weekend. The concert was filmed and a year later released as Live Voodoo DVD, which received mixed reviews. "It all falls rather flat, a two-dimensional sound robbing the likes of 'Ocean Size' and 'Ted, Just Admit It' of any sense of dynamics," Phil Mongredien of Q wrote.

Jane's Addiction returned to Australia in February 2010 for the Soundwave Festival. Avery left the band following the festival, stating: "That's it. With equal parts regret and relief, the Jane's Addiction experiment is at an end."

2010–2012: The Great Escape Artist
The band began working with Guns N' Roses bassist Duff McKagan on new material. with a picture of the group working together posted on Navarro's Twitter page. It was later confirmed by Dave Navarro on his Dark Matter radio program that McKagan had indeed joined Jane's Addiction on a permanent basis.

The new lineup of Jane's Addiction made their debut, performing at singer Perry Farrell's 51st birthday celebration, at Les Deux in Los Angeles, California on March 30.

In April 2010, the group announced two European dates, scheduled for June, taking place at the GelreDome, in Arnhem, Netherlands, and an appearance at the Rock in Rio in Madrid, Spain. Preceding these shows in Europe was a one-off Cinco de Mayo concert that took place at the Bardot in Hollywood, California on Wednesday, May 5, 2010. During the show, they debuted a new song titled "Soulmate". In September 2010 McKagan left the band.

On September 25, 2010, Jane's Addiction performed a live set for "Guitar Center Sessions" on DirecTV. The episode included an interview with the band by program host, Nic Harcourt.

On January 5, 2011, the band announced that they had recruited TV on the Radio guitarist and producer Dave Sitek as a replacement for Duff McKagan. Sitek was set to record the bass for the band's fourth studio album, entitled The Great Escape Artist. On January 14, 2011, while talking about the recording of the new album, drummer Stephen Perkins mentioned that although Sitek was a "stabilizing force" for Jane's Addiction, and was to appear on the upcoming album, he was not the band's full-time bassist as was previously reported. It was then confirmed that Sitek would not be touring with the band, which was set to promote the album on a summer tour, including headlining Reading and Leeds Festivals. These sets would later be cancelled due to Farrell's illness. It was then announced that Chris Chaney would be the band's live bassist for some shows in 2011. On March 30, 2011, a song from The Great Escape Artist, titled "End to the Lies" was premiered on the Chilean radio station Radio Futuro, and was also performed at Lollapalooza Chile on April 3, 2011. On April 8, "End to the Lies" was released via their website as free to download. On July 23, 2011, the band headlined the Gathering of the Vibes Music and Arts festival in Bridgeport, Connecticut. On August 3, 2011, the band released the second single entitled "Irresistible Force". The initial release date for new album was scheduled for September 27, 2011, but was postponed until October. The Great Escape Artist was released on October 18, 2011. In an interview with Jason Tanamor, guitarist Dave Navarro said, "This album is different because the band went in a new direction that we haven’t been in before but at the same time there are many familiar threads of where we used to come from. It’s an evolution from where we were but always remembering where we came from."

Jane's Addiction launched their Theatre of the Escapists Tour in 2012 to a sold-out crowd at the 2,000 seat Pageant Theatre in St. Louis, Missouri. In February 2012, Perry Farrell discussed the possibility of releasing a follow-up to The Great Escape Artist while touring in support of the album, stating, "What I have not seen before is a group that's done a record, had somewhat of a theme – escapism – and then done a second record almost as if it was a follow-up movie. I want to do that. We have material left from The Great Escape Artist we didn't record. I'm very inspired to keep with the theme. Something's feeling right about it." 

In 2012, the band contributed a studio cover of the Rolling Stones' 1968 song "Sympathy for the Devil" to the television series Sons of Anarchy.

2013–2021: Continued activity and anniversary touring

After finishing up touring in support of The Great Escape Artist, the band remained active with several subsequent tours, releases and band-related projects. They released their second live album, Live in NYC, on July 8, 2013, recorded during their "Theatre of Escapists" tour. On August 8, 2013, they released a stand-alone studio single, called "Another Soulmate", which they had previously performed live during Duff McKagen's brief tenure as bass guitarist in 2010. Later that year, Jane's Addiction was awarded with the 2,509th star of the Hollywood Walk of Fame on October 30, 2013. Their star is located at 6436 Hollywood Boulevard.

In 2014, the band embarked upon a tour performing Nothing's Shocking in full. In 2016, they launched the Sterling Spoon Anniversary Tour, celebrating the 25th anniversary of Ritual De Lo Habitual and Lollapalooza. Special guests on the tour included Dinosaur Jr., Living Colour, and Fishbone. A live album from this tour, Alive at Twenty-Five, was released on August 4, 2017.

On February 6, 2020, ten seconds of a song entitled "Laughing Beats" (also referred to as "Embrace the Darkness") was played by Dave Navarro's guitar tech Dan Cleary on Rare Form Radio. The song was recorded with Eric Avery and produced by Trent Reznor in 2009, prompting speculation that the song could be released in full in the near future.

On February 8, 2020, Jane's Addiction performed for the first time in over two years at a memorial show for Andrew Burkle, son of billionaire Ronald Burkle, who died in January 2020. The band was joined on stage by John Frusciante for "Mountain Song". Frusciante was there performing with the Red Hot Chili Peppers for the first time in 13 years after recently rejoining the band. Stephen Perkins also filled in for Chili Peppers drummer Chad Smith during their performance due to Smith being unable to attend due to an art show appearance.

2022–present: Eric Avery's second return and Navarro's absence
On May 11th, 2022, the Smashing Pumpkins announced the Spirits on Fire Tour, a 32-date trek across America with Jane's Addiction, starting in Dallas on October 2nd and wrapping up in Los Angeles at the Hollywood Bowl on November 19th. After contracting COVID-19 in December 2021, Dave Navarro continued to suffer health complications from long COVID, causing the band to cancel their planned summer festival appearances at Welcome to Rockville and Lollapallooza. Farrell and Perkins reformed Porno for Pyros to replace the band at both events, leading to a full reunion of Porno for Pyros' original line-up.

Upon reuniting Porno for Pyros, Perry Farrell stated that he would also like to see Jane's Addiction record new material in 2022 in addition to touring. On August 17, 2022, the band revealed on Instagram that founding bass guitarist Eric Avery had returned to Jane's Addiction after a twelve-year absence. Later that week, Avery confirmed that the band were working on new material: "Four promising new song ideas. Big thanks to you all for all the kind words of support. It leaves me feeling inspired. Honestly. It produces the best kind of pressure, your passion leaves me determined to do all I can for Jane’s Addiction."

Avery's surprise return was revealed to have been tentatively in the works since 2020, with Foo Fighters drummer Taylor Hawkins helping facilitate phone calls between Farrell and Avery for a possible reunion in honour of Lollapalooza's 30th anniversary in 2021. Farrell envisioned the band becoming a five-piece with then-current bass guitarist Chris Chaney remaining in the band alongside Avery. Avery resisted the scenario, and despite the Farrell and Avery coming to a peaceful understanding with one another, the original line-up of Jane's Addiction did not reunite due to the ongoing COVID-19 pandemic.

Following Taylor Hawkins' death in March 2022, Farrell reached out to Avery: "He presented this idea of me returning to Jane’s, and how we would do it. He was like, ‘Here’s a few years’ plan of how to return some luster to Jane’s Addiction.’ It involved writing new music and playing shows. I told him that I’d take the next step, whatever that is." Avery elaborated, "We had what I considered to be the most meaningful and honest and respectful talk that we’ve had since the Jane’s 1.0 days. I don’t mean to sound so ‘new age-y’ about it, but it was sort of a healing of a rift.” With Avery returning to the band, Chaney was let go after an eleven-year tenure. The split became acrimonious between Farrell and Chaney: "Chris knew that this day would come because we talked about it. When Taylor died, things really changed in our relationship. We can definitely call it ‘estranged.’ I do not have a good separation with Chris Chaney, that’s for sure."

Days prior to the band's Spirits on Fire tour with the Smashing Pumpkins, Dave Navarro announced that he wouldn't be performing with the band due to his ongoing struggles with long COVID: "I had hoped for a full recovery by October but I am still very fatigued and will not be able to join this leg. I am personally gutted as our original bass player has returned, Eric Avery. We wanted to bring you the original line-up but that will have to wait until I am recovered. While the band is touring, I will be working on some new Jane’s material in the studio here in LA." For the duration of the tour, Navarro was replaced by Queens of the Stone Age guitarist Troy Van Leeuwen, with Navarro noting: "He is a great guy and I am honoured to have him help make this tour happen." Avery remarked: "Troy is much grittier in every way. There’s sort of like a working-man grit to his playing, and to his sound," elaborating, "This is an opportunity for Jane’s to have a little bit of a different sound. A little bit of a different experience." As the tour progressed, former Red Hot Chili Peppers guitarist Josh Klinghoffer and Bauhaus' Daniel Ash joined the band for select moments during the set, with Farrell noting: "They’re guitar peers, shall we say, of Jane’s. Friends first and foremost, but musical allies for sure."

Following the completion of the tour, the band entered the studio with producers James Ford and Peter Robinson to work on new material. Farrell, Avery and Perkins contributed to the recordings, with Navarro remaining absent. Open invitations were offered to Navarro and recent touring guitarists Van Leeuwen, Klinghoffer and Ash to work on the new material. Farrell noted: "I don't know who will end up recording the guitar tracks, but I’d love to see Dave, Troy, Josh and Daniel contribute — all the guys on the tour that really stuck it out." In January 2023, Klinghoffer was announced as Navarro's replacement for their 2023 tour dates.

Musical style and legacy
A pioneer of alternative metal, Jane's Addiction is credited for the mainstream exposure of the alternative music scene in the 1990s. The band is also associated with the avant-garde metal and funk metal genres.

Emerging from Los Angeles' glam metal and goth scene, Jane's Addiction's music contains elements of heavy metal, punk rock, folk, jazz fusion, funk rock, psychedelic rock and progressive rock. The band's other prominent influences included '70s heavy metal, art rock, post-punk  and gender bending glam rock. The band was also labeled as "funk-punk". Their album, Strays was labeled as "nu metal", a genre to which the band was a precursor.

Jane's Addiction is regarded as one of the most influential acts in alternative music. Tom Morello of Rage Against the Machine compared the band's influence to that of Nirvana. Artists influenced by Jane's Addiction include Tool, Korn, The Smashing Pumpkins, Limp Bizkit, Candlebox, P.O.D., Oceansize, Paul Banks of Interpol, Nothingface, Stabbing Westward, Incubus, System of a Down, Devin Townsend and Strapping Young Lad.

Talking about Ritual de lo Habitual, Alice Cooper remarked, "I can spot traces of other people on this album, us included, but that's all they are: traces. They were a really original band. This is their peak album, where they really went out on a limb. Sometimes I get so caught up in these songs, I can actually feel the band pushing themselves to their limits. Sometimes I can't believe how strong it is. I wonder if this will have the same effect on some kid as Chuck Berry had on me ..."

"Nothing's Shocking influenced me a lot, especially with what Eric Avery proposed from the bass," says Nick Oliveri, of Queens of the Stone Age, Kyuss and Mondo Generator. "Eric had written the music on his own, the guitars and the drums came later. So he inspired me on that side, it is very possible that they were the first really alternative band."

Not all their contemporaries were impressed, however. "People can't be looking at things like Jane's Addiction as some sort of alternative," complained Sugar bassist David Barbe. "It's just corporate dick rock. It's Van Halen with different makeup artists."

Side projects

Porno for Pyros 
The band members pursued other projects in the 1990s. Farrell and Perkins formed another band, Porno for Pyros, and had some success with their two albums, Porno for Pyros (1993) and Good God's Urge (1996); meanwhile, Avery and Navarro formed Deconstruction and put out a self-titled one-off album in 1994. Dave Navarro joined the Red Hot Chili Peppers in 1993 and in the same year Stephen Perkins started a band named Banyan, with core members Nels Cline, Mike Watt, and Willie Waldman (with revolving studio guests). Banyan have released three albums as, their self titled-debut, Anytime At All and Live at Perkins' Palace.

Others 
During their second major split, the band were involved in a number of other projects. Navarro, Perkins, and Chaney formed a new band, The Panic Channel, with singer Steve Isaacs, who together released one album, titled (ONe), in 2006. Perry Farrell, together with his wife Etty Lau Farrell and Extreme guitarist Nuno Bettencourt, formed Satellite Party. The band signed with Columbia Records and released their debut album, Ultra Payloaded in 2007. Eric Avery signed with Dangerbird Records for the release of his solo album Help Wanted in 2008.

Band members

Current members
 Perry Farrell – lead vocals, guitar, programming, keyboards, piano 
 Eric Avery – bass, acoustic guitar 
 Dave Navarro – guitar, acoustic guitar, keyboards, piano 
 Stephen Perkins – drums, percussion, steel pan 

Touring members
Josh Klinghoffer – guitar , additional guitar 

Former members
 Chris Brinkman – guitar 
 Matt Chaikin – drums 
 Flea – bass , trumpet 
 Martyn LeNoble – bass 
 Duff McKagan – bass 
 Chris Chaney – bass 

Former touring members
Troy Van Leeuwen – guitar 
Daniel Ash – additional guitar 

Timeline

Awards and nominations
{| class="wikitable sortable plainrowheaders" 
|-
! scope="col" | Award
! scope="col" | Year
! scope="col" | Category
! scope="col" | Nominee(s)
! scope="col" | Result
! scope="col" class="unsortable"| 
|-
! scope="row"|BT Digital Music Awards
| 2004
| Best Use of Mobile
| Jane's Addiction Flashmob
| 
|
|-
! scope="row" rowspan=7|Pollstar Concert Industry Awards
| 1988
| Club Tour of the Year
| Tour
| 
|
|-
| rowspan=2|1991
| Best New Rock Artist
| Themselves
| 
|rowspan=2|
|-
| Small Hall Tour of the Year
| rowspan=5|Tour
| 
|-
| 1992
| Most Creative Stage Production 
| 
|
|-
| 1998
| Small Hall Tour of the Year
| 
|
|-
| 2004
| rowspan=2|Most Creative Tour Package
| 
|
|-
| 2010
| 
|
|-
! scope="row"|Webby Awards
| 2012
| Best Music Video
| Jane's Addiction Comes Alive
| 
|
|-
!scope="row"|Žebřík Music Awards
| 2003
| Best International Surprise
| Themselves
| 
|

Discography

Studio albums
 Nothing's Shocking (1988)
 Ritual de lo Habitual (1990)
 Strays (2003)
 The Great Escape Artist (2011)

References

Sources
 
 
 
 
 
 Mullen, Brendan. Whores: An Oral Biography of Perry Farrell and Jane's Addiction. Cambridge: Da Capo, 2005.

External links
 
 
 Jane's Addiction  at Rolling Stone
 

 
Alternative rock groups from California
Musical groups from Los Angeles
American alternative metal musical groups
American funk metal musical groups
Musical groups established in 1985
Musical groups disestablished in 2004
Musical quartets
Psychedelic rock music groups from California
Warner Records artists
Virgin Records artists
Musical groups reestablished in 2008
1985 establishments in California